WFDF may refer to:

 WFDF (AM) (910 AM), talk formatted broadcast radio station licensed to Farmington Hills, Michigan
 World Flying Disc Federation, the international governing body for flying disc sports
 Wet feet, dry feet policy, the United States policy regarding Cuban immigration